is a private junior college in Matsudo, Chiba, Japan. It was established in 1933 as a specialized school, and became a junior college in 1965. In 1972, a distance education course was set up. It has been attached to Seitoku University since 1990.

The college was named in honour of Shōtoku, a medieval regent. His name's first syllable, shō has an alternative reading sei (the Kan’on reading), which was used for naming this school.

Departments
 Department of childcare studies

See also 
 List of junior colleges in Japan

External links
 Seitoku University Junior College

Public universities in Japan
Japanese junior colleges
Universities and colleges in Chiba Prefecture
Matsudo